The Black King is a comedy-drama 1932 race film chronicling the rise and fall of a fictionalized charismatic leader of a back-to-Africa movement, modeled on the life of Marcus Garvey. The film was directed by Bud Pollard.

Themes 

The Black King chronicles the rise and fall of a fictionalized charismatic leader of a back-to-Africa movement, satirizing the life of Marcus Garvey. The film explores numerous critiques of Garvey's movement, including the lack of knowledge about Africa, the presumptuousness in making plans for future development and government in Africa without consultation of people already there, and conflicts between lighter skinned and darker skinned African Americans. While Garvey was a primarily a political leader with religious opinions, his counterpart in the film was primarily a preacher and religious leader. The film was intended to resonate with the audience's pre-existing disillusionment with Garvey.

History 

The Black King was written as a stage play by Donald Heywood and plans were publicly announced to produce it on Broadway directed by Russian choreographer Léonide Massine. This never took place. Instead, Heywood's story was adapted by Morris M. Levinson and it was produced as a film by Southland Pictures under white director Bud Pollard in 1932. The film was re-released in the 1940s under the title, Harlem Big Shot.

Cast
A.B. DeComathiere as Charcoal Johnson
Vivianne Baber as Mary Lou Lawton
Knolly Mitchell as Sug
Dan Micahels as Brother Longtree
Mike Jackson as Brother Lawton
James Dunmore as Nappy
Harry Gray as Deacon Jones
Mary Jane Watkins as Mrs. Bottoms
Freeman Fairley as Mob Leader
Ishmay Andrews as Mrs. Ashfoot
Trixie Smith as Delta
Lorenzo Tucker as Carmichael

Reception 
Daniel J. Leab, a 1975 commentator, rates it well as entertainment, saying it has "a more carefully plotted storyline than most other black genre films of its time". Kevin Thomas of the Los Angeles Times wrote in 1988 that despite the film's small budget, the film has "considerable scope and energy... largely due to a dynamic, brutally comic burlesque of... [lead actor] A. B. Comathiere".

Citations

References

Further reading

External links 

 AllMovie
 IMDB
 Turner Classic Movies

1932 films
African-American cinema
American black-and-white films
Race films
American comedy-drama films
1932 comedy-drama films
1930s American films
1930s English-language films